The African Women's Union of Congo (abbreviated U.F.A.C.) was a women's organization in Congo-Brazzaville. U.F.A.C. was closely associated with the Congolese Youth Union (U.J.C.). U.F.A.C. largely failed to obtain a following beyond the milieus around U.J.C.

U.F.A.C. was affiliated to the International Women's Federation (F.I.F.).

Leadership
Alice Mahoungou (nee Alice Badiangaba) was a women's activist and politician in Brazzaville who became one of the leaders of the African Women's Union of the Congo (U.F.A.C.). In addition, she was an activist on behalf of the Congolese Youth Union (U.J.C.).

References

Women's organisations based in the Republic of the Congo